The Guardians of the Galaxy are a fictional superhero team appearing in American comic books published by Marvel Comics. Dan Abnett and Andy Lanning formed the team from existing and previously unrelated characters created by a variety of writers and artists, with an initial roster of Star-Lord, Rocket Raccoon, Groot, Phyla-Vell, Gamora, Drax the Destroyer, and Adam Warlock.

These Guardians first appeared in Annihilation: Conquest #6 (April 2008). A feature film set in the Marvel Cinematic Universe based on this team was released in 2014. A sequel, titled Guardians of the Galaxy Vol. 2, was released in 2017, and the team has also been featured in the crossover films Avengers: Infinity War (2018), Avengers: Endgame (2019), Thor: Love and Thunder, the Disney+ The Guardians of the Galaxy Holiday Special (both 2022) and the upcoming film Guardians of the Galaxy Vol. 3 (2023). This Guardians team is the second to operate under the name, following the original team created by Arnold Drake, Roy Thomas and Stan Lee in 1969.

Publication history
The second volume of the title was published in May 2008, written by Dan Abnett and Andy Lanning and featured a new team of characters from the Annihilation: Conquest storyline.

Abnett and Lanning's work on the Annihilation: Conquest story laid the foundation for the new Guardians of the Galaxy book that they had been wanting to launch for some time. Editor Bill Rosemann, who had also edited Annihilation: Conquest, provided more background: "As the planning of 'Annihilation: Conquest' came together, it occurred to us that, if things went well, there would be a group of characters left standing who would make for a very interesting and fun team." It also provided the motivation the team would need, as "on the heels of two back-to-back wars, they're out to prevent any new Annihilation-size disasters from erupting."

The title ran parallel with Nova vol. 4, which was also written by Abnett and Lanning. The two crossed over in the storylines "War of Kings" and "Realm of Kings". Paul Pelletier pencilled the first seven issues. Brad Walker and Wes Craig alternated pencilling tasks from #8 to #25.

The book was cancelled in April 2010 with issue 25. Some plot threads were concluded in The Thanos Imperative 1–6 and its two one-shots (May 2010 – Jan 2011).

The team appeared reassembled in Avengers Assemble #4–8 (June–October 2012).

The Guardians of the Galaxy appeared in a series for the 2012 Marvel NOW! branding, starting with issue 0.1 written by Brian Michael Bendis and drawn by Steve McNiven, which saw Iron Man join the team. Later issues of the series saw Angela, Agent Venom, and Captain Marvel join.

In 2014, to tie into the feature film, Marvel debuted Legendary Star-Lord, a solo series written by Sam Humphries, and a Rocket Raccoon solo series. The following year saw a solo Groot miniseries written by Jeff Loveness.

Guardians of the Galaxy was relaunched as part of the 2015 All-New, All-Different Marvel initiative with Brian Michael Bendis and Valerio Schiti returning as writer and artist respectively. The series sees Peter Quill and Gamora leaving the team, and Rocket becoming the new team's self-appointed leader, also two new characters were added to the team. Kitty Pryde (taking up the mantle of Star-Lord) and the Thing. As part of the same initiative, Star-Lord starred in a 2015 solo series again written by Humphries, while Drax and Gamora starred in their own individual solo series written by CM Punk and Nicole Perlman, respectively.

Team history
In the aftermath of the Phalanx invasion of the Kree, Star-Lord decides to form a team of interstellar heroes that will be proactive in protecting the galaxy, rather than reacting to crises as they happen. To this end, he recruits Adam Warlock, Drax the Destroyer, Gamora, Phyla-Vell (the new Quasar), Rocket Raccoon, and Groot, with Mantis as support staff. On the recommendation of their ally, Nova, the group establishes a base of operations on the space station Knowhere, which possesses a teleportation system with near-universal range. An intelligent, telepathic dog named Cosmo the Spacedog is Knowhere's chief of security and works closely with the new team. After a confrontation with the Universal Church of Truth, the team meets a semi-amnesiac man who identifies himself as Vance Astro – Major Victory of the original Guardians of the Galaxy. Astro's declaration inspires the as-yet-unnamed team to adopt the "Guardians of the Galaxy" name for their own. When the team learns Star-Lord directed Mantis to telepathically coerce the heroes into joining the team, they disband.

Rocket Raccoon decides to continue Star-Lord's mission and starts a search for the missing members. His new team includes Bug, Mantis, Major Victory, and Groot, who is fully regrown. Meanwhile, Star-Lord was banished to the Negative Zone by Ronan the Accuser for his actions during the Phalanx's attempted conquest of the Kree Empire. There, he finds himself in the middle of King Blastaar's fight to break into 42 and use its portal to invade Earth. Star-Lord allies with Jack Flag to defend the prison and contact the other Guardians for rescue. Rocket's new team successfully brings both of them back, and Flag becomes a Guardian. Elsewhere, Drax and Phyla begin looking for Cammi, but on their search they talk to a seer who tells them about an oncoming war. Phyla is able to wake Moondragon from the dead, but loses her Quantum Bands in the process. The consequence for Phyla is that she is now the new avatar of death. They go back to Knowhere and do not follow up on the search for Cammi.

War of Kings

Warlock and Gamora return and inform the team of the War of Kings. They split into three teams, one each to the Kree and Shi'ar, and one staying on Knowhere to coordinate. The Kree team is heard by Black Bolt and the Inhumans, but their request for peace is denied. The Shi'ar team is attacked by Vulcan and the Imperial Guard, leading them to ally with the Starjammers.

Star-Lord, Mantis, Bug, Jack Flag, and Cosmo are taken to the 31st Century by that era's Guardians, who warn them of the creation of an all-destroying energy rift called The Fault at the war's conclusion. Trapped in the future, Star-Lord's team is able to get a message to Warlock in the 21st Century. Warlock is unable to stop The Fault's creation, but is able to contain it with a spell that requires a stable, unused timeline. Warlock chooses the one he previously erased, causing him to become the Magus. Star-Lord's team, with the help of Kang the Conqueror, are returned to this point in the timestream. To escape, Magus fakes the death of himself, Mantis, Cosmo, Major Victory, Martyr, and Gamora.

Martyr frees herself with the help of Maelstrom, and enables Mantis to call the other Guardians for help telepathically. When they come to the rescue, Phyla-Vell is misled by Maelstrom into freeing Thanos. Thanos kills Martyr, but is captured by the Guardians and taken back to Knowhere as a prisoner.

The Thanos Imperative
In the 2010 miniseries The Thanos Imperative, the universe is invaded by the Cancerverse, a universe that lies on the opposite side of the Fault, a rift in space-time formed at the end of "War of Kings". The Guardians take Thanos to the Cancerverse in an attempt to end the war early. Along the way, Drax attacks Thanos and is killed. They are ultimately successful at ending the war, but Thanos is left enraged and promising to kill everyone. Along with Nova, Star-Lord remains in the collapsing Cancerverse as the other Guardians escape.

After the death of Star-Lord, the Guardians disband. Still believing in their cause, Cosmo recruits another team under the name "Annihilators". Rocket Raccoon and Groot later reunite and decide to continue the Guardians' legacy after the duo prevent an incident on Rocket's home world, Halfworld.

The new team appears on Earth to aid the Avengers against Thanos.

Marvel NOW!

The Marvel NOW! iteration of the team includes Star-Lord, Drax the Destroyer, Gamora, Groot, Rocket Raccoon, and Iron Man. After Star-Lord's father visits him in a bar to tell him that it is forbidden for any alien species to visit Earth, Iron Man is attacked by an army of Badoon invading Earth. The Guardians and their newest member Iron Man defeat the ship; however, London is still invaded. The Guardians defend London and finish off the horde of Badoon but learn that, for violating the "Earth-is-off-limits" rule (the Spartax Earth Directive), they are to be placed under arrest by the King of Spartax. The Guardians manage to escape with the help of Groot, who had recently regrown after being destroyed by a Badoon ship's explosion.  In April 2013, it was announced that Image Comics' Angela (Spawn) would join the Marvel Universe as the result of a legal battle between Neil Gaiman and Todd McFarlane. After appearing in the "Age of Ultron", she joins the Guardians. Captain Marvel and Agent Venom later have stints as team members as well.

During the "Secret Wars" storyline, the Guardians of the Galaxy take part in the incursion between Earth-616 and Earth-1610. During the incursion, Rocket Raccoon and Groot are killed by the Children of Tomorrow, Star-Lord is teleported away trying to come up with a back-up plan, and Gamora and Drax the Destroyer are surrounded and confused by the corpses of their comrades. During the subsequent conflict with the Beyonder-empowered Doom, Star-Lord is one of the survivors of the previous universe, piloting the 616 and Ultimate versions of Mister Fantastic in to mount a final assault on Doom's castle, and revealing that he kept a twig from Groot in his pocket until the right moment.

All New All-Different Marvel
During the "Secret Empire" storyline, the Guardians of the Galaxy assist Captain Marvel, the Ultimates, the Alpha Flight Space Program, Hyperion, and Quasar in fighting the Chitauri wave. Captain America, who was brainwashed into being a Hydra sleeper agent, activates the Planetary Defense Shield, trapping them outside of Earth.

In 2020, Marvel announced a reboot of the series, written by Al Ewing and drawn by Juann Cabal. This new series depicts the titular team, led by Star-Lord and Rocket Raccoon and including Marvel Boy, Nova, Phyla-Vell, Moondragon and Hercules, fighting against the Gods of Olympus, with Gamora, Groot, and Drax also appear as prominent supporting characters. Wiccan and Hulkling later join as members.

Members

Reception

Volumes

Guardians of the Galaxy - 2008 
The 2008 series holds a 7.5 out of 10 critic rating on the review aggregator website Comic Book Round Up.

The May 2008 sales estimate for the first issue was 39,854 copies, making it the 61st top-selling comic title that month. The first and second issues sold out, and were later published as part of a collected edition.

Al Ewing's run of Guardians of the Galaxy received a nomination for the GLAAD Media Award for Outstanding Comic Book at the 32nd GLAAD Media Awards in 2021.

Other versions
During the "Secret Wars" storyline in the domain of King James' England (which is based on the Marvel 1602 reality), the Guardians of the Galaxy have a counterpart here named the Gardiner's Men. They are a troupe of performers consisting of Madam Gomorrah, Peadar O'Cuill, Arthur Dubhghlas, Goodman Root, and Aroughcun the Raccoon. Angela later befriended them when she helped to fight off attacking beasts. In another story, "Baby Thanos", other team members appeared with Cable instead of Star-lord from the resurrected and remade universe where they became "Punisher Universe". But there were other team members as well, where there were Peni Parker, Wolverine, Kamala Khan(Captain Marvel), Juggernaut (Juggerduck), Cloak and Dagger, Iron Groot, and others heroes. But everyone was killed by Frank Castle in order to protect the infant Thanos.

In other media

Television
 The Guardians of the Galaxy are mentioned by the Dark Surfer in the episode "When Strikes the Surfer" of the animated series The Super Hero Squad Show.
 The Guardians of the Galaxy appear in the episode "Michael Korvac" of the animated series The Avengers: Earth's Mightiest Heroes. In this adaptation, the team consists of Star-Lord, Rocket Raccoon, Groot, Quasar, and Adam Warlock. They arrived on Earth where they pursued Korvac. They battle the Avengers, who think Korvac is a pursued victim, and later team up with them to defeat Korvac.
 The Guardians of the Galaxy appear in the Ultimate Spider-Man episode "Guardians of the Galaxy". The team consists of Star-Lord, Rocket Raccoon, Gamora, Groot, and Drax the Destroyer. The Guardians of the Galaxy were responsible for training Nova. Rocket Raccoon calls upon Nova and Spider-Man to help the Guardians of the Galaxy fight the Chitauri led by Korvac. In "The Return of the Guardians of the Galaxy", the Guardians land on Earth to repair their ship at the time when Titus was leading the Chitauri into claiming Nova's helmet. After the Guardians of the Galaxy's ship is repaired, they helped Nova and Spider-Man fight Titus and the Chitauri. After Titus was defeated even when S.H.I.E.L.D. arrives, the Guardians of the Galaxy leaves with Titus in their custody while the remaining Chitauri escapes.
 The Guardians of the Galaxy appear in the Avengers Assemble episode "Guardians and Space Knights". Their first designs were based on their appearance in Ultimate Spider-Man, and were voiced by the same actors. Their later appearance changed their design and voice actors to reflect their subsequent animated series, which reflected the characters' designs in the feature films.
 The Guardians of the Galaxy appear in the Hulk and the Agents of S.M.A.S.H. episode "It's a Wonderful Smash". In their self-titled episode, the Agents of S.M.A.S.H. run into the Guardians of the Galaxy when they come across a plot by Super-Skrull to create gamma-powered Skrulls on an unnamed planet. In the episode "Planet Monster" Part 2, the Guardians of the Galaxy are among the superheroes that help the Agents of S.M.A.S.H. and the Avengers fight the forces of the Supreme Intelligence.
 The Guardians of the Galaxy appear in their own self-titled episode of Marvel Disk Wars: The Avengers.
 A Guardians of the Galaxy animated series closely modeled after feature film was released in September 2015.
 The Guardians of the Galaxy appeared in Marvel's Spider-Man in a two-part crossover.
 The Guardians of the Galaxy appear in their own Lego short Lego Marvel Super Heroes – Guardians of the Galaxy: The Thanos Threat.
 The Guardians of the Galaxy Holiday Special is an original special released on Disney+, and is about a Christmas celebration that the Guardians give Quill on their new headquarters of Knowhere. Cosmo the Spacedog is also revealed to be a new member of the team.

Film

 The Guardians of the Galaxy appear in the Marvel Cinematic Universe, with the characters portrayed in a more comedic manner. The group's founding members are Star-Lord, Gamora, Drax, Rocket, and Groot. They first appeared in Guardians of the Galaxy and return in Guardians of the Galaxy Vol. 2, both directed by James Gunn. In the latter movie, the team's membership expanded with the addition of Mantis while temporary aided by Yondu Udonta and Nebula in their fight against Ego the Living Planet. Sean Gunn's character Kraglin also assists the team in the final confrontation.
 The team appears in Avengers: Infinity War, in which they meet Thor and split up from each other, with Rocket and Groot going with Thor to Wakanda on Earth to help the Avengers, while the others confront Thanos on Titan. They try to stop him in his attempt to collect all of the Infinity Stones in order to use the Infinity Gauntlet to kill half of all the living beings in the universe. Thanos succeeds in collecting all of Stones, murdering Gamora in the process, and when he disintegrates half of all life in the universe with a snap of his fingers (an act known as the Infinity Snap), Star-Lord, Drax, Mantis, and Groot are among his victims, with only Rocket and Nebula spared.
 In Avengers: Endgame, after Thanos has destroyed the Stones and is executed by Thor, Rocket and Nebula become members of the Avengers and travel through the Quantum Realm to retrieve the Infinity Stones from alternate timelines, in order to reverse the Infinity Snap. They are successful, but an alternate Thanos becomes aware of the presence of this other Nebula, and has her captured, sending Nebula’s alternate counterpart to the present in the former's place. The Avengers are successful in reversing the Infinity Snap, bringing Thanos' victims back to life, including the Guardians, but 2014 Nebula summons Thanos to the present, where he destroys the Avengers headquarters and summons his army in order to acquire the Stones to kill the entire universe. Nebula successfully convinces 2014 Gamora to join her in opposing Thanos, and kills her counterpart, though 2014 Gamora has no emotional connection to Quill. The combined forces of the Avengers, the Guardians, the Ravagers, and the rest of the Avengers' allies succeed in repelling his forces, and killing Thanos once and for all. Afterwards, Thor joins the Guardians, quipping that they are now the "Asgardians of the Galaxy", and jokingly argues with Star-Lord over command of the team.
 The team makes an appearance in Thor: Love and Thunder, with the Guardians helping Thor on several adventures. After the group saves a planet whose gods have been killed by Gorr, Thor and Korg split off from the Guardians to take down the God Butcher. Before departing, Star-Lord gives Thor the advice that he should be allowed to feel the pain of losing those he loves as opposed to feeling nothing at all and keeping everyone at arm's length. 
 A third film, Guardians of the Galaxy Vol. 3, is currently in post-production and set to release in 2023.

Video games
 Rocket Raccoon appears in Ultimate Marvel vs. Capcom 3 as a playable character.
 The Guardians of the Galaxy appear in the MMORPG, Marvel Heroes.
 The Guardians of the Galaxy appear in Lego Marvel Super Heroes. The team consists of Groot, Rocket Raccoon, Drax the Destroyer, Gamora, and Star-Lord. The game's Guardians of the Galaxy achievement also considers Ronan the Accuser and Nova as members of the team.
 The Guardians of the Galaxy appeared in Marvel: Avengers Alliance.
 Star-Lord, Drax, Gamora, Rocket, Groot, Yondu, and Ronan appear as playable characters in Disney Infinity: Marvel Super Heroes.
 Rocket Raccoon and Gamora appear as playable characters in Marvel vs. Capcom: Infinite. Groot appears as part of Rocket's moveset.
 Many Guardians-related characters are featured in the mobile game Marvel: Contest of Champions by Kabam as playable characters, including Star-Lord, Gamora, Drax, Rocket, Ronan, Groot, Angela, Yondu, and Nebula
 The Guardians of the Galaxy appear as the main protagonists in Guardians of the Galaxy: The Telltale Series.
 Star Lord, Gamora, Drax, Rocket Raccoon, Groot (as a child and adult), Mantis, Yondu and Nebula appear in Lego Marvel Super Heroes 2
 Star Lord, Gamora, Drax, Rocket Raccoon and Groot appear in Marvel Ultimate Alliance 3: The Black Order, where they are also the starting characters to pick in the game’s storyline, while Groot and Rocket are a two-in-one playable characters.
The Guardians of the Galaxy appear as the main protagonists of Marvel's Guardians of the Galaxy, a single-player game focusing on Star-Lord as the main playable character. The team also consists of Gamora, Rocket Raccoon, Drax, and Groot.

Toys
 A Guardians of the Galaxy three pack for the Marvel Universe 3 3/4" toyline includes a Rocket Raccoon, Star-Lord, Drax, and a miniature Groot. The three were rereleased individually as part of the Avengers Infinite toyline.
 A Drax figure and a Rocket Raccoon Build-A-Figure have been released in their Guardian uniforms as part of the Marvel Legends line.
 Film versions of the team were released as part of the Marvel Minimates toyline in late 2014.
 Hot Toys released the film versions of Guardians of the Galaxy 12" figures (30 cm) starting in January 2015 with Peter Quill aka Star-Lord. Rocket Racoon, Groot, Gamora, and Drax were subsequently released in 2015.

Theme parks
 An attraction titled Guardians of the Galaxy – Mission: BREAKOUT!, opened at Disney California Adventure Park on May 27, 2017. It is a re-branding of the former The Twilight Zone Tower of Terror attraction, utilizing the existing structure and ride system.
In 2017 it was announced that Guardians of the Galaxy: Cosmic Rewind would replace the Universe of Energy at Disney World's Epcot. The attraction is a "storytelling roller coaster" with cars modeled after the Milano starship from the feature films, which spin in order to direct passengers to different parts of a narrative, and opened in time for Disney World's 50th anniversary celebration in October 2021.

Live performance
The Guardians of the Galaxy appears in Marvel Universe LIVE! stage show.

Collected editions

Volume 2 (Abnett and Lanning)

Volume 3 (Brian Michael Bendis)

Guardians Team-Up

Secret Wars Miniseries

Volume 4 (Brian Michael Bendis)

Guardians of Infinity

All New Guardians of the Galaxy (Gerry Duggan)

Volume 5 (Donny Cates)

Volume 6 (Al Ewing)

Other Miniseries

References

External links

 
 Guardians of the Galaxy at Marvel Wiki
 
 
Guardians of the Galaxy at Don Markstein's Toonopedia. Archived from the original on September 1, 2016.

2008 comics debuts
Comics by Dan Abnett
Marvel Comics titles
Science fiction comics
Characters created by Dan Abnett
Characters created by Andy Lanning
Comics adapted into animated series
Guardians of the Galaxy
Marvel Comics adapted into films
Marvel Comics adapted into video games
Marvel Comics extraterrestrial superheroes
Marvel Comics superhero teams